Vue is a software tool for world generation by e-on software with support for many visual effects, animations and various other features. The tool has been used in several feature-length movies.

Versions

Users
Blue Sky Studios
Digital Domain
DreamWorks Animation: Kung Fu Panda
Industrial Light & Magic: Indiana Jones and the Kingdom of the Crystal Skull, Pirates of the Caribbean: Dead Man's Chest
Sony Pictures Imageworks
Warner Bros. Interactive Entertainment
Weta Digital

See also
Blender
Cinema 4D
3dsmax 
Maya
Unity 3D
Unreal
Daz
Photoshop
Lightwave 3D
Modo
Substance
Bryce

References

External links
E-on Software

3D graphics software
Computer graphics